Emergency Couple is a 2014 South Korean television series starring Song Ji-hyo and Choi Jin-hyuk with Lee Pil-mo, Choi Yeo-jin and Clara. It aired on cable channel tvN from January 24 to April 5, 2014 on Fridays and Saturdays at 20:40 for 21 episodes. The romantic comedy/medical drama is about a divorced couple whose tumultuous feelings for each other are rekindled when they become reunited years later as interns at the same hospital.

Due to the popularity of the drama, it was extended by one episode. Broadcasting rights of the drama were also sold to 9 countries.
A special music talk show titled Reply with Music - Emergency Couple was aired on May 6, 2014, to thank the audience for their support.

Plot
While in their early twenties, a medical school student, Oh Chang-min, and a dietitian, Oh Jin-hee, fall in love and marry despite his family's strong opposition. Chang-min comes from a family of wealthy, successful doctors who believe Jin-hee is not good enough for him,  prompting them to cut him off financially after he marries her. In order to earn money right away, Chang-min gives up his dream of becoming a doctor, and instead becomes a pharmaceutical salesman. He is miserable at his job, while Jin-hee's inferiority complex deepens as her husband's family continues to look down on her. They begin to fight constantly and eventually get a divorce. Six years later, Chang-min has gone back to med school to pursue his dream, while Jin-hee has also put herself through med school. They end up as interns at the same hospital, where they will have to work in the emergency room together for three months.

Cast

Main characters
Song Ji-hyo as Oh Jin-hee, intern
Choi Jin-hyuk as Oh Chang-min, intern
Lee Pil-mo as Gook Cheon-soo, attending physician of Emergency Medicine 
Choi Yeo-jin as Shim Ji-hye, assistant professor of surgery
Clara Lee - Han Ah-reum, intern
Yoon Jong-hoon as Im Yong-gyu, intern

Supporting characters
Im Hyun-sung as Park Sang-hyuk, intern and Young-ae's husband
Chun Min-hee as Lee Young-ae, intern and Sang-hyuk's wife
Choi Beom-ho as Go Joong-hoon, chief of Emergency Medicine
Park Sung-geun as Ahn Young-pil, surgeon
Heo Jae-ho as Jang Dae-il, third year resident
Kwon Min as Kim Min-ki, first year resident
Kim Hyun-sook as Choi Mi-jung, ER head nurse
Lee Sun-ah as Heo Young-ji, ER nurse
Choi Yu-ra as Son Ye-seul, ER nurse
Lee Mi-young as Jo Yang-ja, Jin-hee's mother
Jeon Soo-jin as Oh Jin-ae, Jin-hee's younger sister
Park Doo-shik as Kim Kwang-soo, indie singer and Jin-ae's husband
Park Joon-geum as Yoon Sung-sook, Chang-min's mother
Kang Shin-il as Oh Tae-seok, Chang-min's father
Park Ji-il - as Yoon Sung-gil, Chang-min's uncle
- as Yoon Sung-mi, Chang-min's first aunt
- as Yoon Sung-ja, Chang-min's second aunt

Cameo appearances
Yoon Joo-sang as priest (ep 1 and 14)
Lee Han-wi as Dr. Jeon Hyung-seok (ep 1)
Jeon Soo-kyeong as hospital director (ep 1)
Yoon Bong-gil as drunk patient with gun (ep 2)
Jung Joo-ri as Chang-min's blind date (ep 3)
Gary as a Mr Taxi (ep 6)
DickPunks as indie band (ep 6)
Nam Jung-hee as female patient (ep 18-19)
Narsha as female patient (ep 19)
Kim Kang-hyun as male patient (ep 19)

Ratings
 In this table,  represent the lowest ratings and  represent the highest ratings.
 N/A denotes that the rating is not known.

Original soundtrack

International broadcast
It started airing in Thailand on PPTV HD from October 29, 2014 to June 12, 2015 at 10:00. It is also available to stream on Iflix with a variety of subtitles in Thailand, Malaysia, Philippines, Indonesia and Sri Lanka.

References

External links
 

2014 South Korean television series debuts
2014 South Korean television series endings
South Korean medical television series
South Korean romantic comedy television series
TVN (South Korean TV channel) television dramas
Korean-language television shows
Television series by KeyEast